The Wonderful Years is a 1980 West German drama film directed by Reiner Kunze and starring Gabi Marr, Martin May, Dietrich Mattausch and Christine Wodetzky.  It was based on Kunze's own book Die wunderbaren Jahre which was deeply critical of the system of government in East Germany. It won a Bavarian Film Award in the Best Screenplay category.

Cast
 Gabi Marr ...  Cornelia
 Martin May ...  Stephan
 Dietrich Mattausch ...  Herr Bergmann
 Christine Wodetzky ...  Frau Bergmann
 Rolf Boysen ...  Pfarrer
 Bärbel Deutschmann ...  Eva
 Thomas Frontzek ...  Michael
 Erich Schleyer ...  Klaus
 Joane Prawitz ...  Angelika
 Hans Helmut Dickow ...  Direktor
 Eberhard Mondry ...  Beckert
 Katharina Matz ...  Lehrerin
 Carola Schwarz ...  Ute Weber
 Harald Dietl ...  Major
 Klaus Münster ...  Brigadier

References

External links

1980 films
1980s coming-of-age drama films
German coming-of-age drama films
West German films
1980s German-language films
Films based on German novels
Films set in East Germany
Works about the Stasi
Films critical of communism
1970s German films
1980s German films